Curvilinear coordinates can be formulated in tensor calculus, with important applications in physics and engineering, particularly for describing transportation of physical quantities and deformation of matter in fluid mechanics and continuum mechanics.

Vector and tensor algebra in three-dimensional curvilinear coordinates

Elementary vector and tensor algebra in curvilinear coordinates is used in some of the older scientific literature in mechanics and physics and can be indispensable to understanding work from the early and mid 1900s, for example the text by Green and Zerna.  Some useful relations in the algebra of vectors and second-order tensors in curvilinear coordinates are given in this section.  The notation and contents are primarily from Ogden, Naghdi, Simmonds, Green and Zerna,  Basar and Weichert, and Ciarlet.

Coordinate transformations 
We shall assume that  these coordinates systems are embedded in the three-dimensional euclidean space. Coordinates   and  may be used to explain each other, because as we move along the coordinate line in one coordinate system we can use the other to describe our position.

 for 

which can be written as

  for 

We will therefore represent the transformation from the coordinate system with coordinate variables  to the coordinate system with coordinates  as:

 for 

similarly we can write the free equations more compactly as

 for 

We will represent the transformation from the coordinate system with coordinate variables  to the coordinate system with coordinates  as:

If  is linear the coordinate system  will be called an affine coordinate system ,otherwise  is called a curvilinear coordinate system

The Jacobian 

consider

The resultant matrix is called the Jacobian matrix.

Vectors in curvilinear coordinates
Let (b1, b2, b3) be an arbitrary basis for three-dimensional Euclidean space.  In general, the basis vectors are neither unit vectors nor mutually orthogonal.  However, they are required to be linearly independent.  Then a vector v can be expressed as

The components vk are the contravariant components of the vector v.

The reciprocal basis (b1, b2, b3) is defined by the relation 

where δi j is the Kronecker delta.

The vector v can also be expressed in terms of the reciprocal basis:

The components vk are the covariant components of the vector .

Second-order tensors in curvilinear coordinates
A second-order tensor can be expressed as

The components Sij are called the contravariant components, Si j the mixed right-covariant components, Si j the mixed left-covariant components, and Sij the covariant components of the second-order tensor.

Metric tensor and relations between components
The quantities gij, gij are defined as

From the above equations we have

The components of a vector are related by
l

Also,

The components of the second-order tensor are related by

The alternating tensor
In an orthonormal right-handed basis, the third-order alternating tensor is defined as

In a general curvilinear basis the same tensor may be expressed as

It can be shown that

Now,

Hence,

Similarly, we can show that

Vector operations

Identity map
The identity map I defined by  can be shown to be:

Scalar (dot) product
The scalar product of two vectors in curvilinear coordinates is

Vector (cross) product
The cross product of two vectors is given by:

where εijk is the permutation symbol and ei is a Cartesian basis vector.  In curvilinear coordinates, the equivalent expression is:

where  is the third-order alternating tensor. The cross product of two vectors is given by:

Therefore,

and

Hence,

Returning to the vector product and using the relations:

gives us:

Tensor operations

Identity map
The identity map  defined by  can be shown to be

Action of a second-order tensor on a vector
The action  can be expressed in curvilinear coordinates as

Inner product of two second-order tensors
The inner product of two second-order tensors  can be expressed in curvilinear coordinates as

Alternatively,

Determinant of a second-order tensor
If  is a second-order tensor, then the determinant is defined by the relation

where  are arbitrary vectors and

Relations between curvilinear and Cartesian basis vectors
Let (e1, e2, e3) be the usual Cartesian basis vectors for the Euclidean space of interest and let

where Fi is a second-order transformation tensor that maps ei to bi.  Then,

From this relation we can show that

Let  be the Jacobian of the transformation.  Then, from the definition of the determinant,

Since

we have

A number of interesting results can be derived using the above relations.

First, consider

Then

Similarly, we can show that

Therefore, using the fact that ,

Another interesting relation is derived below.  Recall that

where A is a, yet undetermined, constant.  Then

This observation leads to the relations

In index notation,

where  is the usual permutation symbol.

We have not identified an explicit expression for the transformation tensor F because an alternative form of the mapping between curvilinear and Cartesian bases is more useful.  Assuming a sufficient degree of smoothness in the mapping (and a bit of abuse of notation), we have

Similarly,

From these results we have

and

Vector and tensor calculus in three-dimensional curvilinear coordinates

Simmonds, in his book on tensor analysis, quotes Albert Einstein saying

Vector and tensor calculus in general curvilinear coordinates is used in tensor analysis on four-dimensional curvilinear manifolds in general relativity, in the mechanics of curved shells, in examining the invariance properties of Maxwell's equations which has been of interest in metamaterials and in many other fields.

Some useful relations in the calculus of vectors and second-order tensors in curvilinear coordinates are given in this section.  The notation and contents are primarily from Ogden, Simmonds, Green and Zerna,  Basar and Weichert, and Ciarlet.

Basic definitions
Let the position of a point in space be characterized by three coordinate variables .

The coordinate curve q1 represents a curve on which q2, q3 are constant.  Let x be the position vector of the point relative to some origin.  Then, assuming that such a mapping and its inverse exist and are continuous, we can write 

The fields ψi(x) are called the curvilinear coordinate functions of the curvilinear coordinate system ψ(x) = φ−1(x).

The qi coordinate curves are defined by the one-parameter family of functions given by

with qj, qk fixed.

Tangent vector to coordinate curves
The tangent vector to the curve xi at the point xi(α) (or to the coordinate curve qi at the point x) is

Gradient

Scalar field
Let f(x) be a scalar field in space.  Then

The gradient of the field f is defined by

where c is an arbitrary constant vector.  If we define the components ci of c are such that

then

If we set , then since , we have

which provides a means of extracting the contravariant component of a vector c.

If bi is the covariant (or natural) basis at a point, and if bi is the contravariant (or reciprocal) basis at that point, then

A brief rationale for this choice of basis is given in the next section.

Vector field
A similar process can be used to arrive at the gradient of a vector field f(x).  The gradient is given by

If we consider the gradient of the position vector field r(x) = x, then we can show that

The vector field bi is tangent to the qi coordinate curve and forms a natural basis at each point on the curve.  This basis, as discussed at the beginning of this article, is also called the covariant curvilinear basis.  We can also define a reciprocal basis, or contravariant curvilinear basis, bi.  All the algebraic relations between the basis vectors, as discussed in the section on tensor algebra, apply for the natural basis and its reciprocal at each point x.

Since c is arbitrary, we can write

Note that the contravariant basis vector bi is perpendicular to the surface of constant ψi and is given by

Christoffel symbols of the first kind
The Christoffel symbols of the first kind are defined as

To express Γijk in terms of gij we note that

Since bi,j = bj,i we have Γijk = Γjik.  Using these to rearrange the above relations gives

Christoffel symbols of the second kind
The Christoffel symbols of the second kind are defined as

in which

This implies that

Other relations that follow are

Another particularly useful relation, which shows that the Christoffel symbol depends only on the metric tensor and its derivatives, is

Explicit expression for the gradient of a vector field
The following expressions for the gradient of a vector field in curvilinear coordinates are quite useful.

Representing a physical vector field
The vector field v can be represented as

where  are the covariant components of the field,  are the physical components, and (no summation)

is the normalized contravariant basis vector.

Second-order tensor field
The gradient of a second order tensor field can similarly be expressed as
l

Explicit expressions for the gradient
If we consider the expression for the tensor in terms of a contravariant basis, then

We may also write

Representing a physical second-order tensor field
The physical components of a second-order tensor field can be obtained by using a normalized contravariant basis, i.e.,

where the hatted basis vectors have been normalized.  This implies that (again no summation)

Divergence

Vector field
The divergence of a vector fieldis defined as

In terms of components with respect to a curvilinear basis

An alternative equation for the divergence of a vector field is frequently used.  To derive this relation recall that

Now,

we have

The inverse of the matrix is given by

where Aij are the Cofactor matrix of the components gij.  From matrix algebra we have

Hence,

Plugging this relation into the expression for the divergence gives

A little manipulation leads to the more compact form

Second-order tensor field

The divergence of a second-order tensor field is defined using

where a is an arbitrary constant vector.

In curvilinear coordinates,

Laplacian

Scalar field
The Laplacian of a scalar field φ(x) is defined as

Using the alternative expression for the divergence of a vector field gives us

Now

Therefore,

Curl of a vector field
The curl of a vector field v in covariant curvilinear coordinates can be written as

where

Orthogonal curvilinear coordinates
Assume, for the purposes of this section, that the curvilinear coordinate system is orthogonal, i.e.,

or equivalently,

where . As before,  are covariant basis vectors and bi, bj are contravariant basis vectors.  Also, let (e1, e2, e3) be a background, fixed, Cartesian basis.  A list of orthogonal curvilinear coordinates is given below.

Metric tensor in orthogonal curvilinear coordinates

Let r(x) be the position vector of the point x with respect to the origin of the coordinate system.  The notation can be simplified by noting that x = r(x).  At each point we can construct a small line element dx.  The square of the length of the line element is the scalar product dx • dx and is called the metric of the space.  Recall that the space of interest is assumed to be Euclidean when we talk of curvilinear coordinates. Let us express the position vector in terms of the background, fixed, Cartesian basis, i.e.,

Using the chain rule, we can then express dx in terms of three-dimensional orthogonal curvilinear coordinates (q1, q2, q3) as

Therefore, the metric is given by

The symmetric quantity

is called the fundamental (or metric) tensor of the Euclidean space in curvilinear coordinates.

Note also that

where hij are the Lamé coefficients.

If we define the scale factors, hi,  using

we get a relation between the fundamental tensor and the Lamé coefficients.

Example: Polar coordinates
If we consider polar coordinates for R2, note that

(r, θ) are the curvilinear coordinates, and the Jacobian determinant of the transformation (r,θ) → (r cos θ, r sin θ) is r.

The orthogonal basis vectors are br = (cos θ, sin θ), bθ = (−r sin θ, r cos θ).  The normalized basis vectors are er = (cos θ, sin θ), eθ = (−sin θ, cos θ) and the scale factors are hr = 1 and hθ= r. The fundamental tensor is g11 =1, g22 =r2, g12 = g21 =0.

Line and surface integrals
If we wish to use curvilinear coordinates for vector calculus calculations, adjustments need to be made in the calculation of line, surface and volume integrals.  For simplicity, we again restrict the discussion to three dimensions and orthogonal curvilinear coordinates.  However, the same arguments apply for -dimensional problems though there are some additional terms in the expressions when the coordinate system is not orthogonal.

Line integrals
Normally in the calculation of line integrals we are interested in calculating

where x(t) parametrizes C in Cartesian coordinates.
In curvilinear coordinates, the term

by the chain rule.  And from the definition of the Lamé coefficients,

and thus

Now, since  when , we have

and we can proceed normally.

Surface integrals
Likewise, if we are interested in a surface integral, the relevant calculation, with the parameterization of the surface in Cartesian coordinates is:

Again, in curvilinear coordinates, we have

and we make use of the definition of curvilinear coordinates again to yield

Therefore,

where  is the permutation symbol.

In determinant form,  the cross product in terms of curvilinear coordinates will be:

Grad, curl, div, Laplacian

In orthogonal curvilinear coordinates of 3 dimensions, where

one can express the gradient of a scalar or vector field as

For an orthogonal basis

The divergence of a vector field can then be written as

Also,

Therefore,

We can get an expression for the Laplacian in a similar manner by noting that

Then we have

The expressions for the gradient, divergence, and Laplacian can be directly extended to n-dimensions.

The curl of a vector field is given by

where εijk is the Levi-Civita symbol.

Example: Cylindrical polar coordinates
For cylindrical coordinates we have

and

where

Then the covariant and contravariant basis vectors are

where  are the unit vectors in the  directions.

Note that the components of the metric tensor are such that

which shows that the basis is orthogonal.

The non-zero components of the Christoffel symbol of the second kind are

Representing a physical vector field
The normalized contravariant basis vectors in cylindrical polar coordinates are

and the physical components of a vector v are

Gradient of a scalar field
The gradient of a scalar field, f(x), in cylindrical coordinates can now be computed from the general expression in curvilinear coordinates and has the form

Gradient of a vector field
Similarly, the gradient of a vector field, v(x), in cylindrical coordinates can be shown to be

Divergence of a vector field
Using the equation for the divergence of a vector field in curvilinear coordinates, the divergence in cylindrical coordinates can be shown to be

Laplacian of a scalar field
The Laplacian is more easily computed by noting that .  In cylindrical polar coordinates

Hence,

Representing a physical second-order tensor field
The physical components of a second-order tensor field are those obtained when the tensor is expressed in terms of a normalized contravariant basis.  In cylindrical polar coordinates these components are:

Gradient of a second-order tensor field
Using the above definitions we can show that the gradient of a second-order tensor field in cylindrical polar coordinates can be expressed as

Divergence of a second-order tensor field
The divergence of a second-order tensor field in cylindrical polar coordinates can be obtained from the expression for the gradient by collecting terms where the scalar product of the two outer vectors in the dyadic products is nonzero. Therefore,

See also
 Covariance and contravariance
 Basic introduction to the mathematics of curved spacetime
 Orthogonal coordinates
 Frenet–Serret formulas
 Covariant derivative
 Tensor derivative (continuum mechanics)
 Curvilinear perspective
 Del in cylindrical and spherical coordinates

References
Notes

Further reading

External links
 Derivation of Unit Vectors in Curvilinear Coordinates
 MathWorld's page on Curvilinear Coordinates
 Prof. R. Brannon's E-Book on Curvilinear Coordinates

Coordinate systems
3